Syntomodrillia inadrina is an extinct species of sea snail, a marine gastropod mollusk in the family Drilliidae.

Description
The length of the shell attains 6.6 mm, its diameter 2.2 mm.

Distribution
This extinct species occurred in Miocene strata of Trinidad and Tobago; age range: 15.97 to 11.608 Ma

References

 A. J. W. Hendy, D. P. Buick, K. V. Bulinski, C. A. Ferguson, and A. I. Miller. 2008. Unpublished census data from Atlantic coastal plain and circum-Caribbean Neogene assemblages and taxonomic opinions

External links

inadrina